The Rolling Stones' 1971 UK Tour was a brief concert tour of England and Scotland that took place over three weeks in March 1971.

History
The Stones had not staged a tour proper in their homeland since autumn 1966.  Now they were going out after having announced on the day of their first show that they were becoming tax exiles and decamping to the South of France, which they did shortly after finishing the tour.  As a result, this tour was also called the Good-Bye Britain Tour or formulations thereof.

The tour was not lengthy, but audience numbers were enlarged by playing two shows on almost every night.  Although Sticky Fingers was still not released, the group expanded the number of selections from it played compared with the previous Fall's European Tour; "Wild Horses" and "Bitch" were among those added.  Nicky Hopkins took over from Ian Stewart the role of stage keyboardist.

The Brighton, Liverpool, Leeds and London performances were recorded with the Rolling Stones mobile studio by the Rolling Stones crew,. Almost the entire Leeds show was later broadcast in mono by the BBC. A stereo version of the Chuck Berry cover "Let It Rock" from the same concert was officially released on the Spanish edition of "Sticky Fingers" in 1971. A recording of "Let It Rock" from the Leeds concert appeared on the Brown Sugar maxi single in the UK.

Press opportunities focused on the usual banter with lead singer Mick Jagger:

Reporter: "Many remark on the tendency of Mick Jagger to be as feminine as masculine. Would you like to be a woman?"
Jagger: "If God wants me to become a woman, then a woman I will become."

The Groundhogs were the supporting act for the shows.

Bootlegs
The Leeds Concert has been released unofficially numerous times, making it one of the most well-known bootleg recordings of the Rolling Stones to date (most famously with the title Get Yer Leeds Lungs Out, obviously a reference to the Rolling Stones official live record Get Yer Ya-Ya's Out!). All of these recordings however omit the concerts first two songs, "Jumpin' Jack Flash" and "Live with Me", and they are mono recordings. The Marquee Club and Roundhouse Gig have also surfaced on various bootleg records. The 2015 re-release of the album "Sticky Fingers" has seen an inclusion of the complete and remastered Leeds performance in stereo as part of the super deluxe edition. The extended version of the album contains bonus studio outtakes as well as parts of the Roundhouse Concert. Subsequently the Marquee Club has been released separately on 19 June 2015 in CD and vinyl format including a DVD of the performance.

Personnel

The Rolling Stones
Mick Jagger – lead vocals, harmonica
Keith Richards – guitar, backing vocals
Mick Taylor – guitar
Bill Wyman – bass
Charlie Watts – drums

Additional musicians
Nicky Hopkins – piano
Bobby Keys – saxophone
Jim Price – trumpet

Tour set list

The typical set was:

Jumpin' Jack Flash
Live With Me
Dead Flowers
Stray Cat Blues
Love In Vain
Prodigal Son
Midnight Rambler
Bitch
Honky Tonk Women
(I Can't Get No) Satisfaction
Little Queenie
Brown Sugar
Street Fighting Man
Encore: 
Let It Rock

For the rest of the tour some songs were dropped, at certain shows. "Wild Horses" was likely played at the 1st Newcastle show and definitely at the 2nd Newcastle show. It was likely played at other shows as well. Sympathy For The Devil may have been played as the first encore, with Let It Rock as the second encore, at the 2nd Newcastle show. It may have been played at other shows. Through interviews with Mick Jagger and Bobby Keys it appears the band attempted Can't You Hear Me Knocking at least once early in the tour.

Tour dates

References

 Carr, Roy.  The Rolling Stones: An Illustrated Record.  Harmony Books, 1976.

External links
 'Rocks Off' 1971 tour setlists

The Rolling Stones concert tours
1971 concert tours
1971 in the United Kingdom
March 1971 events in the United Kingdom
Concert tours of the United Kingdom